is a Japanese voice actor and sound director. He was formerly credited as 柏倉 つとむ (Kashiwakura Tsutomu).

Voice roles
 Candidate for Goddess: Ernest Cuore
 Captain Tsubasa J: Hikaru Matsuyama
 Chibi Maruko-chan: Hamaji (Noritaka Hamazaki)
 Dark Cat: Ryui Kagezaki
 Digital Devil Story: Megami Tensei: Student
 Fatal Fury: Legend of the Hungry Wolf: Young Terry Bogard
 Generator Gawl: Ryo
 Gestalt: Shoushi
 Goldfish Warning!: Asaba (as a replacement Masaya Onosaka)
 JoJo's Bizarre Adventure: Eyes of Heaven: Sheer Heart Attack
 Little Women II: Jo's Boys: Jack Ford
 Rockman Zero 2/ Remastered Tracks Rockman Zero 3 -TELOS-: Elpis/TK31
 Mobile Suit Zeta Gundam: Navigator (ep. 44)
 Mobile Suit Gundam ZZ: Glemy Toto
 Moero! Top Striker: Roberto Concini
 Nurse Angel Ririka SOS: Nishitokorozawa
 Outlaw Star: Harry MacDougall
 Remi, Nobody's Girl: Emile
 Romeo's Blue Skies: Anzelmo Rossi
 Sailor Moon: Kijin Shinokawa
 Sailor Moon R: Blue Saphir
 Samurai Pizza Cats: Mietoru, Ninja Crows, Gyaman #0
 Shaman King: Conchi
 Super Robot Wars series
 Super Robot Wars Alpha: Glemy Toto
 Super Robot Wars Alpha 2: Kousuke Entouji, Pinchernone
 Super Robot Wars Alpha 3: Tomoro 0117
 Super Robot Wars A Portable: Zeon Soldier, Glemy Toto, Dan Krüger
 Super Robot Wars X: Glemy Toto
 The King of Braves GaoGaiGar: Kousuke Entouji, Pinchernone, Takayasu Sunou
 The King of Braves GaoGaiGar Final: Kousuke Entouji, Tomoro 0117, Takayasu Sunou
 They Were Eleven: Chako Kacka
 Tonde Burin: Mushanokoji Takuma
Urotsukidoji: Kuroko, Idaten
 Yu-Gi-Oh!: Ryo Bakura

Drama CDs
My Sexual Harassment series 2: Yume Kamoshirenai (xxxx) (Junya Mochizuki)
My Sexual Harassment series 3 (xxxx) (Junya Mochizuki)
Osananajimi (xxxx) (Makoto Matsuki)
Que Sera, Sera (xxxx) (Masaki Nikaidou)

References

External links 
 

1966 births
Living people
People from Sagamihara
Japanese male video game actors
Japanese male voice actors
Japanese voice directors
Male actors from Kanagawa Prefecture
20th-century Japanese male actors
21st-century Japanese male actors